Eddie Harsch (born Edward Hawrysch; May 27, 1957 – November 4, 2016) was a Canadian keyboardist and member of Detroit-based jam band Bulldog.  Previous to that he was The Black Crowes' keyboardist from 1991 to 2006. Harsch was replaced on keyboards by Rob Clores and then Adam MacDougall.

Harsch first joined Bulldog during The Black Crowes' hiatus, which lasted from early 2002 to early 2005.  During that time, he also played bass in the Detroit Cobras. In the 1980s, Harsch was a member of James Cotton's band.

In 2016, Harsch was to become a co-founding member of The Magpie Salute, a band which also features his former Black Crowes bandmates Rich Robinson, Marc Ford and Sven Pipien.

Harsch died in Toronto on November 4, 2016, at the age of 59. No cause of death was reported.

References

External links
Eddie Harsch on Myspace
Bulldog on Myspace
Crowes Nest Black Crowes Biographies 1996

1957 births
2016 deaths
Canadian rock keyboardists
The Black Crowes members
Musicians from Toronto
20th-century Canadian male musicians
21st-century Canadian male musicians